The Coliseum Theatre was a cultural and performing arts center located at 4260 Broadway between West 181st and 182nd Streets in the Washington Heights neighborhood of Manhattan, New York City. A full-block building, it was bounded on the east by Bennett Avenue.

During the American Revolution, it was the location of the Blue Bell Tavern, which stood from 1720 to right before the Coliseum was erected, in 1915.

Built in 1920 as B.S. Moss' Coliseum Theatre, the venue was originally a movie palace designed by architect Eugene De Rosa. Marble interiors were done by Voska, Foelsch, & Sidlo Inc, terra cotta by New York Architectural Terra Cotta Company, ornamental plastering by Architectural Plastering Company, Inc., Peter Clark installed the rigging system, windows supplied by S. H. Pomeroy Company, Inc., Sexauer & Lemke Inc. installed the ornamental iron work, draperies and wall coverings by Louis Kuhn Studio, mirrors & console tables by Nonnenbacher & Co, and the pipe organ was installed by M. P. Moller.

The Coliseum was launched by Bow Tie Cinemas before being taken over by RKO Pictures. It housed many vaudeville acts, including The Marx Brothers, W.C. Fields, Eddie Cantor, Uncle Don’s Kiddie Show, and Gertrude Berg.

During the 1980s, a local arts group wanted to rejuvenate the Coliseum as a community arts center, and put on a fundraiser benefit performance Salute to Ol' Vaudeville. It also was the site of the Dominican Film Festival and Children's Film Festival before closing.

In 2011, the building was denied landmark status, and a shopping mall was slated to be opened after demolition. The theater was demolished in 2020.

Gallery

References

1920 establishments in New York City
Broadway (Manhattan)
Cinemas and movie theaters in Manhattan
Former theatres in Manhattan
Movie palaces
Theatres in Manhattan
Theatres completed in 1920
Washington Heights, Manhattan
Buildings and structures demolished in 2020
Demolished theatres in New York (state)
Demolished buildings and structures in Manhattan